This page documents all the known tornadoes that touched down in the United States during 1950. Hundreds of tornadoes went unnoticed in 1950 as only 201 were confirmed, compared to the average of over 1,000 per year.

Confirmed tornadoes

January

January 3 event

January 13 event

January 25 event

January 26 event

February

February 11 event

February 12 event

February 13 event

February 27 event

March

March 1 event

March 16 event

March 19 event

March 26 event

March 27 event

April

April 2 event

April 3 event

April 18 event

April 24 event

April 27 event

April 28 event

April 29 event

May

May 1 event

May 2 event

May 4 event

May 5 event

May 7 event

May 8 event

May 9 event

May 10 event

June

There were 28 tornadoes confirmed in the US in June.

July

There were 23 tornadoes confirmed in the US in July.

August

There were 13 tornadoes confirmed in the US in August.

September

There were three tornadoes confirmed in the US in September.

October

There were two tornadoes confirmed in the US in October.

November

There were four tornadoes confirmed in the US in November.

December

There were four tornadoes confirmed in the US in December.

See also
 Tornadoes of 1950
 List of North American tornadoes and tornado outbreaks

Notes

References

1950
Tornadoes of 1950
Tornadoes
Tornadoes, United States
1950